Formed in 2005,  the Newfoundland and Labrador Association of Realtors (NLAR) represents licensed real estate brokers and salespeople in Newfoundland and Labrador.

NLAR was formed in 2005 by the amalgamation of the Newfoundland Real Estate Association and three local real estate boards:

 Central Newfoundland Real Estate Board
 Humber Valley Real Estate Board (disbanded 2004)
 St. John's Real Estate Board

See also
 Canadian Real Estate Association
 Multiple Listing Service

External links
 Newfoundland and Labrador Association of Realtors
 Real Estate Trading Act

References

Real estate industry trade groups based in Canada
2005 establishments in Canada
Economy of Newfoundland and Labrador